Gachilbong is a mountain that sits on the boundary between the counties of Yanggu and Inje, in Gangwon-do, South Korea.

See also
List of mountains in Korea

Notes

References

Mountains of South Korea
Inje County
Mountains of Gangwon Province, South Korea
One-thousanders of South Korea